Richard Drew (born December 6, 1946) is an Associated Press photo-journalist. In 2001, he took the photo titled The Falling Man, which captured the image of a man falling from the World Trade Center towers following the September 11 attacks. A British documentary 9/11: The Falling Man about the photo premiered on the Discovery Times channel on September 10, 2007.

Drew was one of four press photographers present at the assassination of Robert F. Kennedy.

References

External links
CNN Interview with Richard Drew
Junod, Tom  "The Falling Man", Esquire (September 2003).
9/11: The Falling Man (March 16, 2006). Channel 4.
Howe, Peter (2001).  "Richard Drew".  The Digital Journalist. 

American photojournalists
Living people
Photographers from New York (state)
People associated with the September 11 attacks
20th-century American photographers
21st-century American photographers
1946 births